Nelson Rafael Cuevas Amarilla (born 10 January 1980) is a Paraguayan former footballer and current singer.

He represented the Paraguay national football team at the 2002 and 2006 FIFA World Cups and the 1999 and 2007 Copa América tournaments.

In addition to playing club football in his native Paraguay, Cuevas played for Santos in Brazil, River Plate in Argentina, Universidad de Chile in Chile, Albacete in Spain, Inter Shanghai in China, and three clubs in Mexico.

Career
Born in Asunción, Paraguay, Cuevas started his career at Club Atlético Tembetary, a lower division club from Paraguay, before moving to River Plate of Argentina in 1998. He will forever be remembered by River fans for his memorable goals against Racing and Boca, the first resulting in River's championship win. In the 2004–05 season he was transferred to Club América of Mexico, who loaned him out to Pachuca where he was champion in the year 2006. He then returned to Club América.

Cuevas was released by Club América, and trained for brief period with Premier League club Portsmouth. Portsmouth and Blackburn Rovers were strongly linked to him, with the player stating that a move to England was a possibility. However, Cuevas would end up playing the first half of 2008 for Libertad in his native country and was later signed by Brazilian club Santos in July 2008. On 15 January 2009, he was released from his contract with Santos.

On 9 February, Cuevas signed a six-month deal with Universidad de Chile, one of the most popular teams in that country. On 7 July he won the 2009 Apertura tournament with Universidad de Chile ending with 18 match played and 3 goals. At the end of the tournament he announced that he will not renew with the Chilean club.

During the 2009 off-season Cuevas had trials at FC Twente (making his debut in a friendly match played in the Netherlands, which ended in victory against Borussia Mönchengladbach) and Hannover 96. Cuevas did not finalize his contract with the aforementioned European clubs and returned to Paraguay to play for Olimpia Asunción, where he is trying to return to the top form he once had during his River Plate years. On 16 December 2010 he signed with Mexican football club Puebla F.C.

On 14 July 2011, Cuevas signed a contract with Cerro Porteño.

Deportivo Carapeguá
Cuevas scored his first goal for Deportivo Carapeguá in a 2–0 home victory against Club Libertad on 28 August 2012, Cuevas was substituted onto the field in the 69th minute and scored Carapeguá's second goal in the 88th minute.

International career
Cuevas represented Paraguay U23 at the 2000 CONMEBOL Men Pre-Olympic Tournament.

Cuevas represented Paraguay at the 2002 World Cup, scoring two goals in Paraguay's final group match, a 3–1 win over Slovenia.  Without the two goals, South Africa would have progressed to the second round at Paraguay's expense on goal difference. Cuevas was also in the National team in the Germany 2006 World Cup, and scored the second goal in the 2–0 Paraguay victory over Trinidad & Tobago after an assist by teammate Roque Santa Cruz. Despite the win, Paraguay failed to advance to the second round.

Personal life
His mother, Nidia Amarilla, is also his manager, which is a rarity in the football world. He currently is married to Alicia Ramirez and the couple have one pezuñento: Enzo Rafeal born in 2008.

Singing career
In 2013, Cuevas became a singer, after retiring from football with knee injuries. While making success with music, Cuevas dreams of a comeback to sport.

Honours

Club
River Plate
 Apertura: 1999–2000
 Clausura: 1999–2000, 2001–2002, 2002–2003, 2003–2004

C.F. Pachuca
 Clausura: 2006

Club Libertad
 Apertura: 2008

Universidad de Chile
 Primera División de Chile (1): 2009 Apertura

See also
 Players and Records in Paraguayan Football

References

External links
 
 

1980 births
Living people
Paraguayan footballers
Paraguayan expatriate footballers
Club Atlético River Plate footballers
Universidad de Chile footballers
Expatriate footballers in Argentina
Expatriate footballers in Brazil
Expatriate footballers in Chile
Expatriate footballers in China
Expatriate footballers in Mexico
Expatriate footballers in Spain
Club América footballers
Santos FC players
Club Olimpia footballers
Club Libertad footballers
Association football forwards
Paraguay under-20 international footballers
Paraguay international footballers
2002 FIFA World Cup players
Paraguayan expatriate sportspeople in China
2006 FIFA World Cup players
Paraguayan expatriate sportspeople in Chile
Paraguayan Primera División players
Chilean Primera División players
Argentine Primera División players
Liga MX players
Paraguayan expatriate sportspeople in Brazil
1999 Copa América players
2007 Copa América players
Beijing Renhe F.C. players
Albacete Balompié players
Club Puebla players
Cerro Porteño players
Sportivo Luqueño players